New Music Gathering (NMG) is a yearly American conference/festival hybrid devoted to the performance, development, and promotion of new and contemporary classical music.

The festival, established in 2015 and conducted in a different city each year, includes performances, lectures/recitals, discussion groups, presentations, and coordinated social interaction, including artist meet-ups and live-action role-playing games.

Festivals

References

External links

"New Music Gathering", American Composers Forum

Classical music festivals in the United States
Contemporary classical music festivals
Music festivals established in 2015